Shahbaz Khan (born 9 July 1991) is a Pakistani first-class cricketer who plays for Balochistan cricket team. In September 2019, he was named in Balochistan's squad for the 2019–20 Quaid-e-Azam Trophy tournament.

References

1991 births
Living people
Pakistani cricketers
Balochistan cricketers
Quetta cricketers